Juan Gabriel Jeraldino Jil (born 6 December 1995) is a Chilean footballer who last played for Colchagua in the Segunda División Profesional de Chile.

Personal life
His twin brother, Ignacio, is a Chilean international footballer. They are of Italian descent.

References

External links
 
 

1995 births
Living people
People from San Felipe de Aconcagua Province
Chilean people of Italian descent
Chilean footballers
Primera B de Chile players
Segunda División Profesional de Chile players
Unión San Felipe footballers
Deportes Colchagua footballers
Association football forwards
Chilean twins
Twin sportspeople